The Elliptical Road is a  roundabout in Quezon City which circumscribes the Quezon Memorial Circle, a large park. It was named after its elliptical shape. The spinning in this roundabout is in a counterclockwise direction. The road is divided into 8 lanes, wherein 3 are the main lanes, 4 lanes are for exiting vehicles with one lane for bicycles and pedicabs.

This area of Quezon City is called "PHILCOA", after the Philippine Coconut Authority or PHILCOA, one of the government agencies headquartered there.

Junctions

Landmarks 
Starting from Visayas Avenue, counterclockwise:

 Department of Agriculture
 Ninoy Aquino Parks and Wildlife Center
 Quezon Memorial Shrine
 Lung Center of the Philippines
 National Kidney and Transplant Institute
 Quezon City Hall
 National Housing Authority (Philippines)
 Presidential Car Museum
 Philippine Coconut Authority
 Department of Agrarian Reform

See also
Triangle Park
Major roads in Metro Manila
Quezon Memorial Circle

External links

References

Streets in Quezon City
Roundabouts and traffic circles in the Philippines